Inside the Factory is a British television series produced by Voltage TV for the BBC. The first episode was broadcast on BBC Two in May 2015. Each episode explores how a specific product is made inside a factory. The series is presented by Gregg Wallace, Cherry Healey and historian Ruth Goodman who provides a look at how products came to exist as we know them today.

Initially both Gregg and Cherry visited the factories together, but from the Christmas special of 2017 each of the three presenters was in separate locations, forming different segments of the programme.

Episodes

Series 1

Series 2

Series 3

Series 4

Series 5

"Keeping Britain Going"

Series 6

Series 7

Re-edited and Syndicated versions

Netherlands
In the Netherlands, some episodes have been re-edited together, cutting out the presenters, to produce a series called Binnen in de Fabriek which has been broadcast by RTL.

United States
In the US, the Smithsonian Channel shows a re-edited version of the show, still presented by Gregg Wallace, called Inside the Food Factory, which has also been broadcast on Smithsonian's British Freeview channel.

These episodes are available on the smithsonianchannel.com website.

References

External links
 

2015 British television series debuts
2010s British documentary television series
2020s British documentary television series
BBC high definition shows
BBC television documentaries
Business-related television series in the United Kingdom
Documentary films about business
Documentary television series about industry
English-language television shows
Manufacturing in the United Kingdom
Works about industries
Works about the history of industries
Television series by BBC Studios